Now Esto Es Musica! Latino 4 is a compilation album released on March 24, 2009, and the fourth in a series of Latin-themed editions in the US version of the Now! series.

The song, "Te Quiero", was first featured in a Now-series album on Now! 28, while "Mi Corazoncito" also appeared on Now Esto Es Musica! Latino 3.

Track listing
Enrique Iglesias – "¿Dónde Están Corazón?"
Reik – "Inolvidable"
Luis Fonsi – "No Me Doy Por Vencido"
Kany García – "Estigma De Amor"
Flex featuring Belinda – "Te Quiero"
Juanes – "Odio Por Amor"
Chayanne – "Amor Inmortal"
Juan Luis Guerra – "Como Yo"
Calle 13 featuring Café Tacuba– "No Hay Nadie Como Tú"
R.K.M & Ken-Y – "Te Regalo Amores"
Franco De Vita – "Mi Sueño"
Los Temerarios – "Luz De Luna"
Aventura – "Mi Corazoncito"
Marco Antonio Solís – "No Molestar"
Xtreme – "Shorty Shorty"
Lola – "Si Me Besas"

Charts

Weekly charts

Year-end charts

References

2009 compilation albums
Latino 04
Spanish-language compilation albums
Latin music compilation albums